Robert may refer to:

Bob McPherson (born 1968), British wheelchair curling player at the 2014 Winter Paralympics
Robert McPherson (basketball), basketball coach
Robert McPherson (cricketer) (1864–1904), New Zealand cricketer
Robert McPherson (footballer) (1850–?), Scottish international football (soccer) player
Robert B. McPherson, member of the California legislature